Toledo is a province of central Spain, in the western part of the autonomous community of Castile–La Mancha. It is bordered by the provinces of Madrid, Cuenca, Ciudad Real, Badajoz, Cáceres, and Ávila. Its capital is the city of Toledo.

Demography 
Of the province's 711,228 people (2012), only about 1/9 live in the capital, Toledo, which is also the capital of the autonomous community. The most populated municipalities in the province are Toledo and Talavera de la Reina with 83,741 and 83,303 inhabitants each (INE, 2017).

The province contains 204 municipalities. The smallest municipality in Spain, Illán de Vacas, with a population of 8, is in Toledo province. See List of municipalities in Toledo.

Population development
The historical population is given in the following chart:

Politics and government

Provincial government and administration 

The government body of the province is the Provincial Deputation of Toledo. Its seat is located at Toledo. The members of the plenary of the deputation (diputación) are indirectly elected from among the municipal councillors in the province based on the results of the municipal elections. In turn, the plenary elects the president of the deputation from among its members.

Representation of the Central Government 
The Government of Spain appoints a Government Sub-delegate for the province, whose headquarters are located at Toledo. The Government Delegate charged with the representation in the whole autonomous community of Castile–La Mancha also has its seat in Toledo.

Coat of arms 

Since 2013 the province of Toledo uses the arms of the city, the imperial double-headed eagle Sable bearing an escutcheon with the arms of Castile and Leon, party per pale with the arms of the former Kingdom of Toledo. The eagle is flanked by the pillars of Hercules.

Geography 
The province shares the Parque Nacional de Cabañeros with the province of Ciudad Real. The Corocho de Rocigalgo, located in the Montes de Toledo, is the highest point of the province (1,448 m). The Tagus crosses the province from the northeast to the west. Some right-bank tributaries are the Guadarrama, the Alberche or the Tiétar.

See also
List of municipalities in Toledo

References

Bibliography

External links 

 
T